The  Cima della Fascia is a mountain of the Ligurian Alps located in Piedmont (NW Italy).

Geography  
The mountain stands on the ridge dividing the valleys of Vermenagna and Pesio. Southwards the water divide continues heading to the Punta Mirauda and Bric Costa Rossa, while northwards in connects Cima della Fascia with the main chain of the Alps. The summit, which offers a very vast panorama, is marked by a cairn bearing a metallic summit cross; in the base of the cairn a box contains the summit register.

SOIUSA classification 
According to the SOIUSA (International Standardized Mountain Subdivision of the Alps) the mountain can be classified in the following way:
 main part = Western Alps
 major sector = South Western Alps
 section = Ligurian Alps
 subsection = It:Alpi del Marguareis/Fr:Alpes Liguriennes Occidentales
 supergroup = It:Catena Marguareis-Mongioie/Fr:Chaîne Marguareis-Mongioie
 group = It:Gruppo Testa Ciaudon-Cima della Fascia
 subgroup = It:Dorsale della Cima della Fascia 
 code = I/A-1.II-B.3.b

Geology 

The mountain stands in a karstic area. Its basement is mainly formed of Triassic limestone, the intermediate portion of younger limestone, of Jurassic origin, and the summit of layers of Eocenic schists.

Conservation 
The eastern slopes of the mountain, facing the Pesio Valley, are part of the Natural Park of Marguareis, a nature reserve established by Regione Piemonte.

Access to the summit 

The Cima della Fascia can be reached hiking from Limone Piemonte. The mountain is also accessible in winter by ski mountaineers, with quite a demanding itinerary.

Maps

References

Mountains of the Ligurian Alps
Mountains of Piedmont
Two-thousanders of Italy